The 2004 Brown Bears football team was an American football team that represented Brown University during the 2004 NCAA Division I-AA football season. Brown tied for fourth in the Ivy League. 

In their seventh season under head coach Phil Estes, the Bears compiled a 6–4 record and outscored opponents 222 to 194. Will Burroughs, Anjel Gutierrez and L. Rubida were the team captains. 

The Bears' 3–4 conference record placed them in a three-way tie for fourth place in the Ivy League standings. Brown was outscored 154 to 145 by Ivy opponents. 

Brown played its home games at Brown Stadium in Providence, Rhode Island.

Schedule

References

Brown
Brown Bears football seasons
Brown Bears football